Barefoot in the Park is a 1967 American romantic comedy film directed by Gene Saks from a screenplay by Neil Simon, adapted from his 1963 play of the same name, starring Robert Redford and Jane Fonda as a young newlywed couple. Paul, a conservative lawyer, marries the vivacious Corie, but their highly passionate relationship descends into comical discord in a five-flight New York City walk-up apartment. The supporting cast features Charles Boyer, Mildred Natwick, Herbert Edelman, and Mabel Albertson.

Barefoot in the Park was released theatrically by Paramount Pictures on May 25, 1967, to critical and commercial success, with critics praising its adaptation, light-hearted tone, and cast performances. The film grossed $30 million worldwide on a $2 million budget. For their performances in the film, Natwick was nominated for the Academy Award for Best Supporting Actress and Fonda was nominated for the BAFTA Award for Best Actress. Simon received a nomination for the Writers Guild of America Award for Best Adapted Screenplay.

Plot
Corie (Fonda), a free-spirited young woman, and Paul Bratter (Redford), a conservative, uptight man, are a recently married couple who move into a fifth-floor apartment in Greenwich Village. One of the film's running jokes alludes to the fact that everyone has to climb so many stairs to get to their apartment. Corie decorates the small, leaky space, turning it into a picturesque little home for the two. Among their many eccentric neighbors is the quirky Victor Velasco (Boyer), who befriends Corie and even flirts with her. He lives in the building's attic, so he climbs through the Bratters' window to get to his apartment. He also helps Corie with her place, showing her how to work the seemingly broken heating and plumbing.

Corie sets up a dinner date with Paul, Victor, and Corie's mother, Ethel Banks (Natwick), in a scheme to make her mother fall for Victor. Corie feels that her mother is lonely and in need of love now that she lives alone. Victor takes them all to an Albanian restaurant on Staten Island, whose owner he knows. There the group drinks, and Corie and Victor dance with a belly dancer, while Paul and Ethel watch in embarrassment. Afterward, Corie and Victor return to their building in high spirits as Paul and Ethel drag themselves along in fatigue. As Victor escorts Ethel outside, Corie and Paul begin an argument over their different personalities. Corie feels that her adventurous spirit is impeded by Paul's cautious attitude, noting that he refused to go barefoot in the park with her one evening. His excuse was that it was freezing. Corie says she will kick Paul out and get a big dog to protect her from him. Paul quips that it will finally allow her to have someone who will go barefoot in the park with her. They eventually go to sleep, Corie in their tiny bedroom and Paul on the couch under a hole in the skylight on a snowy February night.

The next day, Paul comes down with a fever, but Corie still insists she wants a divorce. The two spend an awkward time together in their apartment until Corie kicks Paul out. She then receives a call from her aunt, who says that Ethel never came home. Corie panics, and eventually learns that her mother was at Victor's apartment. While Victor was escorting her to her home in New Jersey the previous night, Ethel slipped on icy stairs and fell. Victor and some neighbors took her back to Victor's apartment, where they spent the night. Strangely, Ethel was wearing nothing but her undergarments and Victor's Japanese kimono. It turned out that Victor had Ethel's dress dry-cleaned.

Meanwhile, a drunken Paul skips work and sits in Washington Square Park. Heeding her mother's advice, Corie goes out searching for Paul and finds him drunk and running barefoot through the park. The once cautious Paul is now a fun-loving drunk while Corie cautiously chases after him in order to get him to sober up. Eventually, Paul says it is his apartment and he is going back home. Corie follows. Back at the apartment, Paul, still drunk, climbs onto the roof of the apartment. Scared he might fall, Corie begs him to come down while speaking to him through the hole in the skylight. He says he will only come down if she repeats after him. He wants her to admit that her husband is a crazy drunk, when a few nights before she scolded him for being so cautious and practical even when he is drunk. Meanwhile, realizing where he is, Paul becomes scared, and almost falls off the building. Corie asks Paul to sing an Albanian folk song they had heard at the restaurant that Victor had taken them to calm himself down. While he sings, Corie climbs up to the roof to help him down. A crowd of onlookers starts to gather in the street, including Ethel and Victor. When Corie reaches Paul, they kiss and climb back down as the crowd cheers.

Cast

Reception

Barefoot in the Park opened to positive reviews at the time of its release, although later reviews have been mixed. On Rotten Tomatoes, the film holds an approval rating of 81% based on 54 reviews, with an average rating of 7.1/10. The website's critical consensus reads: "Barefoot in the Park may strike some modern viewers as dated, but what it lacks in timeliness, it more than makes up with the effervescent chemistry between its stars".  On Metacritic, which assigns a rating to reviews, the film has a weighted average score of 55 out of 100, based on 8 critics, indicating "mixed or average reviews".

Bosley Crowther of The New York Times wrote, "If it's romantic farce you delight in – old-fashioned romantic farce loaded with incongruities and snappy verbal gags – then you should find the movie version of Barefoot in the Park to your taste ... But if you are in for a certain measure of intelligence and plausibility in what is presumed to be take-out of what might happen to reckless newlyweds today; if you expect a wisp of logic in the make-up of comic characters, which is, after all, what makes them funny, instead of sheer gagging it up, then beware." Arthur D. Murphy of Variety called the film "a thoroughly entertaining comedy delight about young marriage." Charles Champlin of the Los Angeles Times stated, "High-gloss, low-density comedy requires a special touch and Robert Redford and Jane Fonda handle themselves with a fine, deft charm ... As after a souffle, you may shortly be hungry for something more substantial but while it lasts it's very tasty." Brendan Gill of The New Yorker called the film "a funny adaptation by Neil Simon of his funny play." Leo Sullivan of The Washington Post wrote, "An excellent cast plays the light-as-air plot as coolly as possible. What's most important, it is as funny as ever it was and makes an ideal summer attraction."

Barefoot in the Park spent a record 12 weeks at Radio City Music Hall in New York City grossing a house record $2.3 million.

Accolades

See also
List of American films of 1967

References

External links
 
 
 

1967 films
1967 directorial debut films
1967 romantic comedy films
American films based on plays
American romantic comedy films
1960s English-language films
Films about marriage
Films based on works by Neil Simon
Films directed by Gene Saks
Films produced by Hal B. Wallis
Films scored by Neal Hefti
Films set in apartment buildings
Films set in New York City
Films shot in New York City
Films with screenplays by Neil Simon
Paramount Pictures films
1960s American films